Erik Valdez (born Russell Erik Valdez; August 26, 1979) is an American actor. He is best known for his roles as Trey Mitchell in the soap opera television series General Hospital (2012–2013), Carlito Solano, Jr. in the drama television series Graceland (2014–2015) and Kyle Cushing in the superhero television series Superman & Lois (2021–present).

Early life
Valdez was born Russell Erik Valdez in Lubbock, Texas, on August 26, 1979, the son of Miguel and Karen Valdez. His father is of Mexican, Spanish and Native American descent, while his mother is of English and Irish descent.

His parents were second-generation cotton farmers as he grew up in a close-knit family.

Career
After completing theater throughout the years since high school, Valdez pursued an acting career in film and television and he moved to Los Angeles in the summer of 2004.

In 2004, he made his acting debut as Chad in three episodes of Gilmore Girls. He has made guest appearances television shows, including CSI: Miami, 90210, Numbers and Mistresses.

In 2012, Valdez played the recurring role of Trey Mitchell in the ABC soap opera television series General Hospital, until 2013 for 99 episodes, which earned Valdez a nomination for a NAACP Image Award for Outstanding Actor in a Daytime Drama Series. From 2014 to 2015, Valdez played the role of crime boss Carlito Solano, Jr. in the drama television series Graceland for 11 episodes.

In 2016, he played the role of Lopez in the direct-to-video film Jarhead 3: The Siege. The same year, he played an uncredited role of Officer Valducci in the drama film Paint It Black.

In 2021, he portrayed the character Kyle Cushing in the superhero television series Superman & Lois, which premiered on The CW, featuring Tyler Hoechlin and Elizabeth Tulloch.

Personal life
In 2015, Valdez proposed to his longtime girlfriend, Candice Lopez, a hostess for Radio Disney, and they married in 2016. Together, they have a son: Enzo Ray Valdez (b. 2018)

Filmography

Film

Television

Video games

References

External links
 

1979 births
American male film actors
American male television actors
American male voice actors
American male video game actors
21st-century American male actors
American male actors of Mexican descent
American people of Spanish descent
American people of English descent
American people of Irish descent
Male actors from Texas
People from Lubbock, Texas
Living people